Nosotras las taquígrafas ("We the Stenographers") is a 1950 Mexican film directed by Emilio Gómez Muriel and starring
Alma Rosa Aguirre, Lilia del Valle, and Blanca de Castejón. It is based on a 1949 novel by Sarah Batiza, adapted for the screen by Alfonso Patiño Gómez.

The film's sets were designed by art director Jesús Bracho.

References

External links
 

1950 films
1950s Spanish-language films
1950 drama films
Mexican drama films
Mexican black-and-white films
1950s Mexican films